EDXL Sharp is a C# / .NET 3.5 implementation of the OASIS Emergency Data Exchange Language (EDXL) family of standards.
The purpose of these libraries is to allow developers to:
 Parse EDXL Messages from a string or underlying stream
 Programmatically create EDXL messages
 Validate EDXL Messages to the schema
 Validate that EDXL Messages conform to the additional business rules specified in the standards documentation
 Write EDXL messages to a string or underlying stream

About the project 
EDXL Sharp is licensed under the Apache 2.0 license and is part of a collaborative research project of The MITRE Corporation.

What's in EDXL Sharp 
Version 1.0 includes the following:
 Library for CAP (Common Alerting Protocol) v1.2
 Library for Common Types across the EDXL Standards
 Library for EDXL-DE (Distribution Element) v1.0
 Library for EDXL-HAVE (Hospital Availability Exchange) v1.0
 Library for EDXL-RM (Resource Message) v1.0
 Graphical User Interface (GUI) EDXL-DE Test Tool
 Library for GeoOASIS Where GML Profile
 Library for EDXL xPIL (Extensible Party Information Language) Profile
 Beta Library for EDXL-SitRep (Situation Reporting)
 Beta Library for EDXL-TEP (Tracking of Emergency Patients)

 the 2.0 version is released.  Some of the draft standards implementations are in a separate source tree branch as stable alphas.

Online Testbed 
This effort is a part of a larger interoperability testbed.  The interop testbed serves as an online presence for learning about EDXL, how to implement systems using EDXL, online validation and information sharing tools, and a place to perform integration with other systems that use EDXL.

See also 
 EDXL
 OASIS
 XML
 NIEM

External links
  EDXL Sharp Codeplex Page
  EDXL Wiki
  OASIS EM-TC Public Page
  OASIS EMA-TC Wiki

XML parsers
Computer libraries
Emergency management software